The Matter of Britain character Morgan le Fay (often known as Morgana, and sometimes also as Morgaine and other names) has been featured many times in various works of modern culture, often but not always appearing in villainous roles. Some modern stories merge Morgana's character with her sister Morgause or with aspects of Nimue (the Lady of the Lake). Her manifestations and the roles given to her by modern authors vary greatly, but typically she is being portrayed as a villainess associated with Mordred.

Her stereotypical image, then, is of a seductive, megalomaniacal, power-hungry sorceress who wishes to rule Camelot and overthrow King Arthur, and is a fierce rival of the mage Merlin. Contemporary interpretations of the Arthurian myth sometimes assign to Morgana the role of seducing Arthur and giving birth to the wicked knight Mordred, though traditionally his mother was Morgause, Morgana's sister; in these works Mordred is often her pawn, used to bring about the end of the Arthurian age. Examples of modern Arthurian works featuring Morgana in a role a major antagonist include characters in both the DC Comics (Morgaine le Fey) and Marvel Comics (Morgan le Fay) comic book universes. Some other Arthurian fiction, however, casts Morgana in the various positive or at least more ambivalent roles, and some have her as a protagonist and sometimes a narrator.

Overview
Morgan le Fay has become ubiquitous in Arthurian works of modern culture, spanning mostly fantasy and historical fiction across various mediums including literature, comics, film, and television. As Elizabeth S. Sklar noted in 1992: "Currently a cornerstone of the new Arthurian mythos, [she] occupies a secure position in the contemporary Arthurian pantheon, as familiar a figure to modern enthusiasts as Merlin, Lancelot, or King Arthur himself." Additionally, she has become an archetype serving as a source of tropes for many characters in other modern works, some of them borrowing her name in the form Morgana. As in the case of other modern Arthuriana, Le Morte d'Arthur is the dominant source today.

Prior to her 20th-century resurgence, however, Morgan had been largely absent from modern Arthuriana. The relatively few exceptions of an actual Morgan character include William Morris's epic poem The Earthly Paradise (1870), retelling the story of Morgan and Ogier the Dane. In his popular and often-adapted satirical novel A Connecticut Yankee in King Arthur's Court (1889), Mark Twain cast Morgan le Fay as a deceptively charmful representative of feudal corruption, who is also capable of the most vicious behavior and flirts with the time-travelling protagonist Hank Morgan, her namesake and essentially similar character or even a double (one film adaptation, A Knight in Camelot, stars Whoopi Goldberg as the female protagonist Vivien Morgan who is the only Morgan character in this version, sharing her first name also with one of the names of the Lady of the Lake; Kim Iverson Headlee also wrote the book's continuation novel from Morgan le Fay's own perspective, King Arthur's Sister in Washington's Court).

Since the early 20th century, most modern works feature Morgan as a sorceress and sometimes a priestess, and usually a half-sister of Arthur and sometimes a femme fatale, but some also have her in other roles, including as a fairy or an otherwise non-human character. Many authors effectively merge Morgan with Morgause (traditionally a sister of Morgan and the mother of Mordred from an incestuous union with their brother Arthur) and combine her with the less savory aspects of the Lady of the Lake (this is further positioning a modern Morgan as a nemesis for Merlin, who has never been truly her foe in the medieval Arthurian lore). Such a composite character is then often turned into Mordred's mother or partner. An early instance of such simplifications used to "streamline the plot" was Henry Irving's 1895 stage production King Arthur originally written by W. G. Wills.

Modern authors' versions of Morgan have her usually appear in conventionally villainous roles of a witchlike and irreconcilable enemy of Arthur, recurrently in league with Arthur's bastard son Mordred; be it in the time of the legend or still continuing her feud in the modern era, where she also may be just ruthlessly questing for power or even represent motiveless malevolence. Such Morgan is often devoid of nuances as a merely one-dimensional caricature, examples of which include the portrayals of her in several television films such as Merlin and the Sword (1985, played by Candice Bergen), A Connecticut Yankee in King Arthur's Court (1995, played by Theresa Russell) and Arthur's Quest (1999, played by Catherine Oxenberg). According to Kevin J. Harty, already in the 1953 film Knights of the Round Table she did exhibit "the sexual wiles as well as the deceit and jealousy by now stereotypical for her character." Sklar described a modern stereotype of Morgan as "the very embodiment of evil dedicated to the subversion of all forms of governance, express[ing] the fears that inevitably accompany the sort of radical cultural change represented by the social realities and ideological imperatives of escalating female empowerment during this (20th) century...a composite of all the patriarchal nightmare-women of literary tradition: Eve, Circe, Medea and Lady Macbeth compressed into a single, infinitely menacing package," and whose "sexuality exceeds even that of her prototype and serves as the chief vehicle for her manipulation of others." Notable examples of this pattern are two comic book supervillainesses, Morgan le Fay (created by Stan Lee and Joe Maneely in 1955) in the Marvel Universe and Morgaine le Fey (created by Jack Kirby in 1972) in the DC Universe. A modern Morgan is often an antagonist character for Arthur, Merlin and their followers to overcome and save Camelot, Avalon, or the entire world. Even in Excalibur (1981), John Boorman's film adaptation of Le Morte d'Arthur, the evil Morgana le Fay (played by Helen Mirren) meets her end at the hands of Mordred, her son in the film, instead of accompanying Arthur to Avalon as she did in the source material.

Nevertheless, other modern versions of Morgan's character can be more sympathetic or ambiguous, or even present her as in an entirely positive light, and some also feature her as a protagonist of a story. Alan Lupack noted in 2007 that a modern Morgan has evolved to become "a woman whose own values and concerns [have] become central in some retellings of the Arthurian story;" Fiona Tolhurst pointed out how "some contemporary novelists sanitize or justify" Morgan's origins as "the oversexed counter-hero in most medieval Arthurian texts." One notable example of this trend is Marion Zimmer Bradley's The Mists of Avalon (1983), an influential novel that was later adapted into a television miniseries; other such positions in modern literature, sometimes told in first person from her point of view, include Mary Pope Osborne's series Magic Tree House, Welwyn Wilton Katz's The Third Magic (1988), Fay Sampson's Daughter of Tintagel (1992), Nancy Springer's I Am Morgan le Fay (2001), J. Robert King's Le Morte D'Avalon (2003), and Felicity Pulman's I, Morgana (2014). Cindy Mediavilla praised two still antagonistic but in her opinion non-stereotypical portrayals of Morgan in the 21st-century television series Merlin (2008, played by Katie McGrath) and Camelot (2011, played by Eva Green) "as being among the most fully realized versions of her character in any medium." Some modern authors, especially women, are also particularly interested in the theme of a love-hate relationship between Morgan and Arthur, as studied by Raymond H.Thompson.

Furthermore, since the late 20th century, some feminists have also adopted Morgan as a representation of female power or of a fading form of feminine spirituality supposedly practised by the Celts or earlier peoples. These interpretations draw upon the original portrayal of Morgan as a benevolent figure with extraordinary healing powers. According to Leila K. Norako, "in addition to her appearances in literature, television, and film, Morgan le Fay is also frequently mentioned in the context of neo-pagan religious groups. She is alternately worshipped as a goddess, hailed as a symbol of feminine power, and adopted as a spiritual name." This development was attributed to the influence of The Mists of Avalon, a revisionist retelling of the legend from a feminist and pro-pagan perspective. People who have been named or named themselves specifically after Arthurian figure of Morgan include Morgana Le Fay O'Reilly and Elizabeth Le Fey. Norako wrote:

Arthurian character appearances

The bolded titles mark the character's an appearance as the work's main character and/or narrator.

In literature

Series

21st century

20th century

Books

21st century

20th century

19th century

Short forms

In comics
Morgaine le Fey, a DC Universe supervillainess introduced in 1972, and Morgan le Fay, a Marvel Universe supervillainess introduced in 1955, are discussed in their separate articles.

In film

In television

In video games

In other games

In stage productions

In music

Inspired characters
{| class="wikitable sortable"
|-
!| Title
!| Name
!| Year 
!| Nature
!| Notes
|-
| The Sorcerer's Apprentice (2010 film) || Morgana || 2010 || Evil || style="font-size: 85%;"| An evil sorceress and antagonist.
|-
| Death at King Arthur's Court || Warren Morgan || 2016 || || style="font-size: 85%;"| A posthumous novel by Richard S. Forrest.
|-
| Morgana || Morgana  || 2016 || Evil || style="font-size: 85%;"| A book by D.A. King.
|-
| The Arthur Paladin Chronicles || Morgan ||  2014 || Good ||style="font-size: 85%;"| Novels by David Alastair Hayden and Pepper Thorn, The Shadowed Manse and The Warlock's Gambit.
|-
| The Far Kingdoms: Elements ||  Morgana || 2014 ||Evil || style="font-size: 85%;"| The Far Kingdoms (2013):  In this sequel to The Far Kingdoms, Morgana have survived her battle with Princess Arianna and returned to cast a powerful spell that turned all of Arianna's subjects into stone. Now Arianna needs to again defeat Morgana and remove the curse from her kingdom. 
|-
| Dragon's Crown || Morgan Rizilia || 2013 || Good || style="font-size: 85%;"| A witch is the owner and shopkeeper of Morgan's Magic item shop.
|-
| The House in Fata Morgana || Morgana || 2012 || || style="font-size: 85%;"| A normal girl is accused of being a witch. Upon her death she lingers as a ghost and gains the ability to curse souls, causing those who wronged her to reincarnate and live tragic second lives.
|-
| The After Cilmeri || || 2011 || Good || style="font-size: 85%;"| In this series of novels by Sarah Woodbury, Anna and David are confused for Morgana and Arthur in Prince of Time and Crossroads in Time.
|-
| Ōkami-san || Le Fay Majolica || 2010 || Good || style="font-size: 85%;"| An anime series with a character named Le Fay voiced by Kimiko Koyama in Japanese and Lindsay Seidel in English.
|-
|Highschool DxD||Le Fay Pendragon||2018||Good|| style="font-size: 85%;|In Highschool DxD light novel series, Morgana Le Fay was a legendary witch in ancient times and a contemporary of the Great Wizard Merlin, her descendant Le Fay Pendragon who inherited her magic talent is a prodigy witch of the Hermetic Order of The Golden Dawn, is the love interest of the protagonist Issei Hyoudou.
|-
| The Far Kingdoms || Morgana || 2013 || Evil|| style="font-size: 85%;"| A hidden object puzzle game in which the dark witch Morgana and her minions took over the kingdom of Princess Arianna and bewitched everyone into believing she is the queen. Now Arianna needs to defeat Morgana's sorcery and save the kingdom from evil.
|-
| Morgan Le Fay || Morgan Le Fay || 2012 || ||style="font-size: 85%;"| A novel by G. F. McCauley.
|-
| Morgana, the Queen || Morgana || 2012 || ||style="font-size: 85%;"| A novel in an erotic fantasy series The Histories of the Divine Astarte by Jerome Brooke.
|-
| Knights of the Lunch Table || Morgan || 2011 || Evil|| style="font-size: 85%;"| An old sister and bully of Artie Knight, a student of Camelot High School.
|-
| Schreie der Vergessenen || Morgan le Fay || 2011 || Good || style="font-size: 85%;"| A film featuring a modern Germany magician known as Morgan le Fay (played by Barbara Meier).
|-
| Tales of Monkey Island ||  Morgan LeFlay || 2009 || Other || style="font-size: 85%;"| A female bounty hunter.
|-
| League of Legends || Morgana || 2009 || Evil || style="font-size: 85%;"| The demonic fallen angel Morgana is one of the many Champions (player characters) in this video game. Originally was to be named "Morgana Le".
|-
| Wizard101 || Morganthe || 2008 || Evil || style="font-size: 85%;"|  The dark sorceress named Queen Morganthe, is the second main villain of this MMORPG, where she tries to learn the secrets of the magic of the lost world of Celestia at all costs.
|-
| Power Rangers S.P.D. || Morgana, Mora  || 2005 || Evil || style="font-size: 85%;"| Morgana, also known as Mora in her child form, is a servant of the series' villain Emperor Gruumm.
|-
| Tears to Tiara || Morgan || 2005 || Good || style="font-size: 85%;"| In this video game, manga and anime franchise, Morgan is a Gaelic female warrior, a wife of the protagonist great demon king Arawn, and a friend of Arthur (here also a Gael warrior). 
|-
| Morgaine the Sorceress || Morgaine Fabiano || 2004 || || style="font-size: 85%;"| The protagonist in the series of novels by Joe Vadalma.
|-
| Winx Club || Morgana || 2004 || Good || style="font-size: 85%;"| The former queen of Tir Nan Og (inspired by Tír na nÓg) and the Earth Fairies and mother of Princess Roxy of Earth, of the show's protagonists. She first appears in the episode "Love & Pet".
|-
| Wheel of Time || Moiraine Damodred || 2004 || Good || style="font-size: 85%;"| 
|-
| .Hack//Sign || Morganna || 2002 || Evil || style="font-size: 85%;"| An evil entity originally tasked with giving birth to Aura that traps Tsukasa inside The World and alters his memories to make him more miserable in the hopes that it will corrupt Aura.
|-
| Divine Divinity || Morgana || 2002 || Good || style="font-size: 85%;"| Archmage Morgana is a friendly non-player character in this role-playing video game.
|-
| The Little Mermaid II: Return to the Sea || Morgana || 2000 || Evil || style="font-size: 85%;"| 
|-
| Phoenix Wright: Ace Attorney − Justice for All || Morgan Fey  || 2002 || Evil || style="font-size: 85%;"|A spirit medium of the Fey clan branch family who wishes to usurp the title of heir to the Master of the clan from her niece, Maya Fey. She first tries to frame Maya for murder and later attempts to have her killed.
|-
| Heart of the Dove || Faye Morgan || 1999 || || style="font-size: 85%;"| A novel by Tracy Fobes featuring a witch named Faye Morgan, considered a descendant of Morgana Fay.
|-
| Castelo Rá-Tim-Bum || Morgana || 1997 || Good || style="font-size: 85%;"| A powerful sorceress who lived long, being found in many major events and passages of history and legend.
|-
| Beastmaster III: The Eye of Braxus || Morgana || 1996 || Good || style="font-size: 85%;"| 
|-
| Warhammer || Morgiana Le Fay / The Fay Enchantress || 1996 || Good || style="font-size: 85%;"| The spiritual leader of the land of Bretonnia and emissary of its patron deity, the Lady of the Lake.
|-
| Master of Magic || Morgana  || 1994 || Other || style="font-size: 85%;"| Morgana the Witch is one of the recruitable Hero units in the game.
|-
|  Might and Magic V: Darkside of Xeen || Morgana ||1993 || Evil || style="font-size: 85%;"| Morgana and Xenoc are leaders of a group of evil wizards and sorceress serving of the antagonist Alamar and based in the city of Sandcaster. The good sorceress Astra gives the player a quest to kill them and wipe out their followers.
|-
| Darkwing Duck  || Morgana Macawber || 1991 || Good || style="font-size: 85%;"| A reformed evil sorceress who has become Darkwing Duck's love interest and a member of the Justice Ducks.n She has first appeared in the episode "Fungus Amongus" (chronologically, in "Ghoul of My Dreams" that was aired out of order).
|-
| Small World: An Academic Romance || Fulvia Morgana || 1984 || Good || style="font-size: 85%;"| 
|-
| Knightriders || Morgan || 1981 || Other || style="font-size: 85%;"| A male character played by Tom Savini.
|-
| Doctor Who || Cessair of Diplos, The Cailleach, Morgana Montcalm, Vivien Fay || 1978 || Evil || style="font-size: 85%;"| A character in The Stones of Blood serial.
|-
| The Morgaine Stories || Morgaine  || 1978 || Good || style="font-size: 85%;"| A series of science fantasy novels by C. J. Cherryh.
|-
| The Worst Witch || Morgana || 1974 || Good || style="font-size: 85%;"| A cat of the witch teacher Miss Hardbroom.
|-
| The Marrow of the World || Morgan || 1972 || Evil || style="font-size: 85%;"| 
|}

See also
Fiction featuring Merlin

SourcesPopular Arthurian Traditions edited by Sally K. Slocum (feat. "Morgan le Fay: Goddess or Witch?" by Charlotte Spivack and "Thoroughly Modern Morgan" by Elizabeth S. Sklar). Popular Press, 1992.The New Arthurian Encyclopedia by Norris J. Lac and Geoffrey Ashe. Garland Pub., 1996.King Arthur on Film: New Essays on Arthurian Cinema edited by Kevin J. Harty. McFarland, 1999.A Bibliography of Modern Arthuriana (1500-2000) edited by Ann F. Howey, Stephen Ray Reimer. Boydell & Brewer, 2006.Morgan Le Fay, Shapeshifter'' by Jill Marie Hebert. Palgrave Macmillan, 2013.

References

Celtic mythology in popular culture

Arthurian characters